Stellatoma mellissi is a species of sea snail, a marine gastropod mollusk in the family Mangeliidae.

Description
The adult shell grows to a length of 5 mm, its diameter 2 mm.

The small shell is fusiform-ovate. It has a reddish color and a darker reddish color at the sutures. The body whorl has a red band in the middle. The shell contains 6½ whorls. The 2½ protoconch whorls are convex and smooth. The third whorl is convex and is slightly obliquely lirate. The others have a broad sloping shoulder and a greatly rounded anterior portion. They show about 14 axial ribs. The spiral sculpture consists of 3 cords in the upperwhorls and 16-20 in the body whorl. The aperture is elongate-ovate, measuring about half the total length. The outer lip is marked by transverse striations and is incrassate with a strong denticle close to the posterior sinus. The microscopic structure of this species appears under the microscope to consist of numerous spiral series of very minute grain-like scales, which, at times, are arranged one under the other, so as to produce the appearance of a longitudinal series.

Distribution
This species is found in the Atlantic Ocean off St. Helena.

References

External links

  Bouchet P., Kantor Yu.I., Sysoev A. & Puillandre N. (2011) A new operational classification of the Conoidea. Journal of Molluscan Studies 77: 273-308.

mellissi
Gastropods described in 1890